Andries Noppert (born 7 April 1994) is a Dutch professional footballer who plays as a goalkeeper for Eredivisie club Heerenveen and the Netherlands national team.

Club career

NAC Breda 
Trained through the youth ranks of Heerenveen, Noppert made his professional debut in 2014 for NAC Breda.

Foggia 
In January 2018, he was signed by Italian club Foggia. After traveling by car from the Netherlands to Italy, his car was stolen by the Foggian Mafia. He made his debut for the club on 28 April, in a 3–1 loss to Cittadella. Three months later, the goalkeeper stopped a penalty in the game against Carpi, which ended with a score of 2-0 for Foggia. Over the course of a season and a half, he played 8 matches in Serie B. During his stay in Italy Noppert received the nickname Il Grattacielo ("The Skyscraper" in Italian) from the country's media due to his height.

Dordrecht 
On 12 September 2019, Noppert signed with Dordrecht. After leaving the club he considered joining the police.

Go Ahead Eagles 
In January 2021, Noppert signed with Go Ahead Eagles until the end of the season.

Heerenveen 
Noppert returned to Heerenveen on 16 May 2022, signing a two-year deal. It was his first season as a first-choice goalkeeper.

International career
Noppert was called up to the Netherlands national team in September 2022. In November 2022, he was included in the nation's 26-man squad for the 2022 FIFA World Cup in Qatar. He discovered his inclusion in the squad on TV.

Noppert made his international debut in his country’s opening match at the tournament against Senegal, a 2–0 victory.

Career statistics

International

References

1994 births
Living people
Sportspeople from Heerenveen
Footballers from Friesland
Dutch footballers
SC Heerenveen players
NAC Breda players
Calcio Foggia 1920 players
FC Dordrecht players
Go Ahead Eagles players
Eerste Divisie players
Eredivisie players
Serie B players
2022 FIFA World Cup players
Association football goalkeepers
Dutch expatriate footballers
Dutch expatriate sportspeople in Italy
Expatriate footballers in Italy
21st-century Dutch people
Netherlands international footballers